Miami Rhapsody is a 1995 American romantic comedy film starring Sarah Jessica Parker, Gil Bellows, Antonio Banderas, Mia Farrow, Paul Mazursky, Kevin Pollak, Barbara Garrick, and Carla Gugino. It was written, co-produced and directed by David Frankel in his feature directorial debut, with music composed by Mark Isham.

Plot
Gwyn Marcus (Sarah Jessica Parker) is in her late twenties and has always wanted a marriage like her parents. She has just accepted the proposal of her boyfriend Matt (Gil Bellows), but she has some misgivings about their future together. Her fear of commitment grows as she learns of the various affairs that her family is having. At first, her sister Leslie (Carla Gugino) gets married. Then, six months later, she starts an affair with her old high-school boyfriend, due to her husband's cheapness, despite making a big salary, and constant busy schedule with his football career. Her brother Jordan (Kevin Pollak), already married, starts an affair with his business partner's wife, due to the missing passion between him and his wife, after giving birth to their first child, her mother (Mia Farrow) is growing concerned about Gwyn's being the last single person in the family, despite being the one also in an affair with her mother's and Gwyn's grandmother's nurse, Antonio (Antonio Banderas), due to the constant arguments between her and her father, including the fact that he also had an affair with an insane travel agent. But the more she thinks about marriage, the more she must search for the balance between career, marriage, and family.

Cast

 Sarah Jessica Parker as Gwyn Marcus
 Gil Bellows as Matt
 Antonio Banderas as Antonio
 Mia Farrow as Nina Marcus
 Paul Mazursky as Vic Marcus
 Kevin Pollak as Jordan Marcus
 Barbara Garrick as Terri
 Carla Gugino as Leslie Marcus
 Bo Eason as Jeff
 Naomi Campbell as Kaia
 Jeremy Piven as Mitchell
 Kelly Bishop as Zelda
 Ben Stein as Rabbi
 Donal Logue as Derek

Reception

Critical reception
On Rotten Tomatoes, the film has an approval rating of 45% based on reviews from 20 critics, with an average rating of 6.2/10. The website's critics consensus reads: "Miami Rhapsody has a handful of laughs, but wears its influences so heavily that it can't help but suffer by comparison."

Roger Ebert gave it 3 out of 4 and wrote: "Miami Rhapsody has been dismissed in some quarters as an imitation Woody Allen movie, but since the imitation and the movie are both so entertaining, I don't see what the problem is."

Box office
The film grossed $5 million in the United States and Canada and $10 million worldwide.

References

External links
 
 
 

1995 films
1995 romantic comedy films
American romantic comedy films
Films directed by David Frankel
Hollywood Pictures films
Films set in Coral Gables, Florida
Films set in Miami
Films scored by Mark Isham
1995 directorial debut films
1990s English-language films
1990s American films